James B. Hagan, Sr. (1923–1988) was a member of the Ohio House of Representatives. He had also served as a trustee in Liberty Township, where he resided.

He died of heart disease in 1988 in a hotel in Columbus, where he had been staying to attend a granddaughter's high school graduation.

His brother Robert Hagan and nephews Robert F. Hagan and Timothy Hagan also served in various political offices in Ohio.

References

Members of the Ohio House of Representatives
1923 births
1988 deaths
20th-century American politicians